The Curse of the Antichrist: Live in Agony is the third live album released by German thrash metal band Destruction. It was released on 25 September 2009 by AFM Records.

Track listing

2008 albums
Destruction (band) albums
AFM Records albums
Live thrash metal albums